Eddie de Jong (born 1950, Amsterdam) is a Dutch cartoonist, best known as a frequent collaborator with René Windig. Together they created the comic strip Heinz, about a grumpy sarcastic cat. They won the 1991 Stripschapprijs. They created the album covers for records by the rock band Rockin' Belly.

References

1950 births
Living people
Dutch cartoonists
Dutch comics artists
Dutch humorists
Artists from Amsterdam
Album-cover and concert-poster artists